Josip Broz Tito Square (Плоштад Јосип Броз Тито) is a municipal square in Kumanovo, North Macedonia.

Notable Landmarks
A sculpture takes the northeast corner of the square, Cultural Center makes the south border and SUMA Shopping Center is on the east. On the west and northwest is the Nova Jugoslavija Square and the so-called Skopje Shops are on the north. Also in the northwest corner is the Josip Broz Tito Monument.

List of Events

See also
Nova Jugoslavija Square
 Kumanovo

Gallery

References

Squares in Kumanovo
Cultural depictions of Josip Broz Tito